Kari Marie Aarvold Glaser (born 4 January 1901 – deceased 3 October 1972) was a Norwegian pianist and music teacher, married to the violinist Ernst Glaser, and the mother of pianist Liv Glaser.

Biography 
Aarvold Glaser was born in Kristiania, where she made her concert debut in 1921, and became known as a performing pianist and piano teacher. During her career, she held numerous concerts, both in Norway and abroad. She was married to Ernst Glaser.

References

External links 
40 søskenår ingen hindring Celebrating Ernst Glaser's 100 years anniversary. Aftenposten 

1901 births
1972 deaths
Musicians from Oslo
Norwegian classical pianists
20th-century classical pianists
20th-century classical musicians
Women classical pianists
Norwegian refugees
Refugees in Sweden